Ikryaninsky District is an administrative and municipal district (raion), one of the eleven in Astrakhan Oblast, Russia. It is located in the south of the oblast. Its administrative center is the rural locality (a selo) of Ikryanoye. As of the 2010 Census, the total population of the district was 47,759, with the population of Ikryanoye accounting for 21.0% of that number.

History
The district was established on July 14, 1925.

References

Notes

Sources

Official website of Ikryaninsky District. "Паспорт муниципального образования "Икрянинский район" Астраханской области. 2016 год." (2016 Passport of the Municipal Formation of "Ikryaninsky District" of Astrakhan Oblast) 



Districts of Astrakhan Oblast
States and territories established in 1925